The  occurred in Niigata Prefecture, Japan, at 17:56 local time (08:56 UTC) on Saturday, October 23, 2004. Niigata Prefecture is located in the Hokuriku region of Honshu, the largest island of Japan. The initial earthquake had a magnitude of 6.6 and caused noticeable shaking across almost half of Honshu, including parts of the Tōhoku, Hokuriku, Chūbu, and Kantō regions.

Details 
The first quake struck the Chuetsu area of Niigata Prefecture, Japan with a reading of 7 on the Japanese shindo intensity scale at Kawaguchi, Niigata. The moment magnitude of the earthquake is estimated at 6.6. For comparison, the Great Hanshin earthquake, which devastated much of Kobe, measured 7 on the shindo scale, with a magnitude of 7.3. The earthquake occurred at a depth of 15.8 km.

A second earthquake occurred at 18:11, 16 minutes after the first. This one, at a much shallower depth, had a shindo intensity of 6+ and a magnitude of 5.9. A third, at 6:34, had a shindo intensity of 6−. At 19:45, another intensity 6− earthquake occurred. Intervening and subsequent earthquakes of lesser intensity also shook the region. During the first 116 hours, 15 earthquakes with intensities of shindo 5− or higher rocked the Chuetsu region.

In a press release, the Geographical Survey Institute (GSI) of the Government of Japan published preliminary estimates that a fault having a length of 22 km and a width of 17 km moved approximately 1.4 m.

This was the deadliest earthquake to strike Japan since the January 1995 Great Hanshin earthquake.

This was also first time a snake robot was used at a natural disaster site. A Souryu serpentine robot was used in a house in Nagaoka City that was damaged during this earthquake.

Seismic intensity (JMA)

List of major aftershocks 
The following is a list of major earthquakes that have occurred in Niigata Prefecture since October 23, 2004:

Damage 

As late as November 3, the 39th fatality attributable to the earthquakes occurred as perceptible aftershocks continued. 68 dead and 4,795 injuries were reported in Niigata Prefecture. Over one hundred thousand people fled their homes. The earthquakes caused houses to collapse in Ojiya and damaged thousands in the area. 

For the first time in its 40-year history, a Shinkansen train derailed while in service, the train being too close to the epicentre to be halted by the automatic UrEDAS earthquake detection system. Eight out of ten cars of the Toki 325 service (a 200 Series Shinkansen train) derailed on the Joetsu Shinkansen line between Nagaoka Station in Nagaoka and Urasa Station in Yamato; no injuries were reported among the 155 passengers. The railbed, bridges and tunnels were all affected. East Japan Railway Company (JR East) stopped all trains in Niigata Prefecture, including the extensively damaged Joetsu Line, Shinetsu Main Line, Iiyama Line, Tadami Line and Echigo Line. Part of Nagaoka Station appeared ready to collapse as a result of an aftershock, but after a brief closure, the station reopened. 

The section of the Joetsu Shinkansen between Echigo-Yuzawa Station and Tsubame-Sanjo Station closed. Buses transferred passengers between the two operating sections of the line: Tokyo Station to Echigo-Yuzawa Station and Tsubame-Sanjo Station to Niigata Station.

On December 27, 2004, service resumed on all remaining parts of the Joetsu and Iiyama Lines reopened. On December 28, 2004, the Joetsu Shinkansen also reopened, the last to do so.

Japan Highways closed all expressways in Niigata Prefecture. Closures affected the Kanetsu Expressway and the Hokuriku Expressway. As of November 4, the Kanetsu Expressway remained closed between Nagaoka Interchange and Koide Interchange. This segment reopened on November 5.

Landslides and other problems forced closure of two national highways, National Route 8 and National Route 17, as well as several prefectural roads. This isolated several localities, including nearly the entire village of Yamakoshi, which was then a village in the district of Koshi but since merged with and became part of the city of Nagaoka. On July 22, 2005, the government lifted the nine-month-old evacuation order for 528 of the 690 affected households.

The earthquakes also caused a landslide that partially buried three vehicles. A young boy was rescued from one of these vehicles, but his mother and sister perished. (Recent typhoons had waterlogged the soil, making landslides more likely.)

The quake broke water mains. Extensive electric power, telephone (including cellular telephone) and Internet outages were reported. The cellular telephone system suffered from direct damage to relay stations, as well as depletion of battery back-up power supplies in as little as a day.

Aftermath
On April 1, 2007, the directive to evacuate five settlements in the former village of Yamakoshi (later part of the city of Nagaoka) was lifted. Residents were permitted to return to their homes after a span of nearly two and a half years.

The movie A Tale of Mari and Three Puppies was based on events that took place during this earthquake.

History
Niigata Prefecture has been hit by numerous earthquakes in recorded history. Notable recent ones include a large quake on June 16, 1964 that had a magnitude of 7.5, killing 28, where major liquefaction had occurred and tsunami destroyed the port of Niigata city.

There was also the 2007 Chūetsu offshore earthquake, both striking shortly after major typhoons passed by, causing complications.

See also
List of earthquakes in 2004
List of earthquakes in Japan

References

External links 
 GSI Press Release (in Japanese)
 Earthquakes Kill 21, Hurt 2000 in Japan
 1964 Niigata quake
 

2004 disasters in Japan
Chūbu region
2011 Tōhoku earthquake and tsunami
2004 earthquakes
2004 in Japan
Hokuriku region
History of Niigata Prefecture
October 2004 events in Japan
Landslides in Japan
Shindo 7 earthquakes